The Bâtiment de Transport Léger (abbreviated BATRAL; "Light ferry ship") are small landing ships of the French Navy. Also known as Champlain class by the lead ship, they have been used for regional transport and patrol needs in French Overseas Departments and Territories since the 1970s. On 9 January 2014 it was announced that the two remaining Batrals in French service would be replaced in 2015/16 by three (subsequently four) 1500-tonne Bâtiments Multimission (B2M) at a cost of ~€100m (US$136m).

Design
The BATRALs can ferry over 400 tons of matériel, in the hangar and on the deck. Loading and unloading can be done from a harbour or on a beach. Two flat-bottom vessels allow unloading fifty men and light vehicles each. The accommodations are designed for a Guépard-type intervention unit (five officers, fifteen petty officers and 118 men), or for typical company-sized armoured units.  A helicopter landing deck allows landing for light helicopters, and transfer to and from heavy helicopters.

History
The Chilean Navy purchased the plans and built three ships in the ASMAR shipyards in the early 1980s.

Ships
 French Navy
Champlain decommissioned
Francis Garnier decommissioned
Dumont D'Urville decommissioned in July 2017
Jacques Cartier decommissioned
La Grandière decommissioned in 2016

 Chilean Navy
Maipo (LST-91) 1982–1998
Rancagua (LST-92) 1983–present
Chacabuco (LST-95) 1986–present

 Côte d'Ivoire Navy
 L'Elephant

 Gabon Navy
 President el Hadj Omar Bongo (L05)

 Royal Moroccan Navy
 Daoud Ben Aicha (402)
 Ahmed Es Skali (403)
 Abou Abdallah El Ayachi (404)

References

Amphibious warfare vessel classes
 BATRAL
 BATRAL
Ship classes of the French Navy